USS Teresa (Id. No. 4478) was a cargo ship that served in the United States Navy from 1918 to 1919.

Construction, acquisition, and commissioning
Teresa was built as the commercial cargo ship SS Austrian in 1900 by Russell and Company at Port Glasgow, Scotland, in the United Kingdom, for Unione Austriaca di Navigazione. She later was renamed SS Teresa.

The United States Shipping Board took control of Teresa on 27 September 1917 for United States Government use during World War I, and chartered her to the United States Army the same day, which operated her with a civilian crew. After a dispute between the Army quartermaster and the ship's civilian master, the Army requested that the U.S. Navy man the ship. The Navy accepted the ship, assigned her the naval registry identification number (Id. No.) 4478, and commissioned her on 9 January 1918 at Newport News, Virginia, as USS Teresa (ID-4478).

U.S. Navy career
Assigned to the Naval Overseas Transportation Service, Teresa fitted out for naval use, then headed for New York City on 29 January 1918. She loaded a cargo of U.S. Army supplies there and proceeded to Norfolk, Virginia. On 23 February 1918, she got underway from Norfolk with a convoy for France and arrived at St. Nazaire on 4 March 1918. Teresa made four additional supply trips to France during the next 16 months.

Teresa ended her last U.S. Navy voyage at Philadelphia, Pennsylvania, on 28 June 1919. She was decommissioned at Philadelphia on 19 July 1919 and transferred her back to the United States Shipping Board the same day.

Later commercial service
Once again SS Teresa, the ship resumed commercial service. She was sold in 1923 to G. Perivolaris of Chios, Greece, and renamed SS Demokratia. In 1932 she was renamed Phoenix.

Phoenix was sold for scrapping on 14 November 1932 at Genoa, Italy.

References

NavSource Online: Section Patrol Craft Photo Archive Teresa (ID 4478)

World War I cargo ships of the United States
Ships built on the River Clyde
1899 ships
Cargo ships of the United States Navy